Llust'a K'uchu (Aymara llust'a slippery, k'uchu, q'uch'u corner, "slippery corner", hispanicized spelling Yustacucho) is a mountain in the Andes of southern Peru, about  high. It is situated in the Puno Region, El Collao Province, Santa Rosa District.

References

Mountains of Puno Region
Mountains of Peru